The Muffin Men are a British band, based in Liverpool, England, which primarily plays the music of Frank Zappa and The Mothers of Invention. The group formed in 1990, originally to play a one-off concert to celebrate Zappa's fiftieth birthday. Prior to the COVID-19 pandemic the band toured for thirty unbroken years around The UK, Europe and Scandinavia, performing Zappa's music as a tribute band, along with some of their own compositions. Until his death in 2008, the band often featured guest vocals and percussion by former Mothers of Invention drummer and vocalist Jimmy Carl Black, with whom they also performed songs by Captain Beefheart.

Rather than play pieces note-for-note, the band play their own interpretations of Zappa's material, working to the strengths of the current line-up, often giving the music a different slant to the original versions.

The Muffin Men have played with many Zappa alumni. 
Special guests have included:

Jimmy Carl Black (1938-2008)
Denny Walley
Ike Willis
Mike Keneally
Ray White
Robert Martin
Ed Mann
Bunk Gardner
Don Preston
Napoleon Murphy Brock
Arthur Brown
Eugene Chadbourne
Ben Watson

Jimmy Carl Black toured and recorded with the band for 13 years. (1995-2008).

In 1994 The Muffin Men played a nine-week European tour with guest vocalist/guitarist Ike Willis, and again teamed up with Willis in 2003 for a special Zappanale festival show, which also featured Napoleon Murphy Brock.

Mike Keneally has also appeared with the band, along with Ray White and Robert Martin.

Denny Walley toured and recorded with the band from 2010 to 2018.

25th anniversary gigs (2015) featured a core line-up of 3 original members - Rhino, Jumpy and Roddie, with Phil Hearn on keys.  Past members from the previous lineups made guest appearances at a special show at The Cavern Club in Liverpool.

Original lineup
 Ian (Bammo) Bamford - Lead Guitar & Vocals
 Paul (Rhino) Ryan - Drums & Vocals
 Mike Kidson - Saxophones, Trousers and Vocals
 Andy (Waco) Jacobson - Keyboards & vocals
 Roddie Gilliard - Guitar & Vocals
 Naraish Nathaniel - Bass & Vocals
 Ian Jump - Lead Guitar & Vocals
 Roy Stringer (1956-2001) - Apple Macintosh, samples, vocals and noises

Discography
 1992 - Let's Move To Cleveland/I'm the Slime (7", 33rpm Vinyl Single)
 1992 - The Muffin Men (4-Track CD-Single)
 1993 - Say Cheese And Thank You 
 1994 - Mülm (with Ike Willis)
 1996 - Feel The Food
 1996 - Frankincense (feat Jimmy Carl Black)
 1998 - MufFinZ. (feat Jimmy Carl Black)
 1999 - God Shave The Queen (feat Jimmy Carl Black)
 2001 - More Songs From The Campfire. (feat Jimmy Carl Black)
 2002 - Live @ The Cavern (feat Jimmy Carl Black)
 2003 - Baker's Dozen (feat Jimmy Carl Black)
 2003 - When Worlds Collide (with Ensemble 10:10)
 2008 - Live In The Kitchen Of Love (with Ike Willis) (Limited Fan Release)
 2008 - Looks Like Noodles To Me (with Ike Willis) (Limited Fan Release)
 2011 - Just Another Band from L4 (Limited Fan Release) - feat. Denny Walley, Robert Martin, Ben Watson
 2015 - Sorry We're a Trifle... (Fan Release, limited to 25 copies, to commemorate 25 years in operation) USB card with a selection of live and studio recordings.
 2019 - (It's All) Smoke and Mirrors - Live in the UK. (Limited Fan Release) - feat Denny Walley

The Muffin Men Videography:

 1990-1997 - Muffin Movies Vol.1. (feat Jimmy Carl Black & Ike Willis)
 1998-2003 - Muffin Movies Vol.2
 2003      - Live At Zappanale 14 (with Ike Willis & Napoleon Murphy Brock)
 2004-2005 - Muffin Movies Vol.3
 2012      - Powdered Water. Cd/Promo DVD (Limited Fan Release) - Compositions of Frank Zappa & Don van Vliet feat. Denny Walley

References

External links
band web site

English alternative rock groups